Macaduma fuliginosa is a moth of the subfamily Arctiinae. It was described by Rothschild in 1912. It is found in New Guinea.

References

 Natural History Museum Lepidoptera generic names catalog

Macaduma
Moths described in 1912